Cleorina is a genus of leaf beetles in the subfamily Eumolpinae. It is known from Australia and Asia.

Cleorina modiglianii, a species found in Sumatra, was considered as a potential biological control agent for the giant bramble (Rubus alceifolius), an invasive plant species in La Réunion, but was rejected after testing its host specificity.

Species
Species include:

 Cleorina aeneomicans (Baly, 1867)
 Cleorina andamanensis Jacoby, 1908
 Cleorina assamensis Jacoby, 1908
 Cleorina basalis (Baly, 1867)
 Cleorina basipennis Medvedev, 1995
 Cleorina bevani (Baly, 1877)
 Cleorina bicolor Jacoby, 1908
 Cleorina bicoloripes Pic, 1937
 Cleorina borneoensis Medvedev & Romantsov, 2014
 Cleorina bosi Medvedev, 2008
 Cleorina bryanti Medvedev, 2009
 Cleorina buechi Medvedev, 2008
 Cleorina castanea Lefèvre, 1885
 Cleorina chlorina Takizawa, 1988
 Cleorina collaris (Baly, 1867)
 Cleorina costata Tan & Wang, 1981
 Cleorina costatella Medvedev, 2009
 Cleorina dohertyi Jacoby, 1908
 Cleorina dura (Weise, 1923)
 Cleorina femorata Medvedev, 2009
 Cleorina flavipes Medvedev, 2009
 Cleorina flavoornata Medvedev, 1995
 Cleorina fulva Jacoby, 1908
 Cleorina fulvicornis Medvedev, 2008
 Cleorina fulvipes Lefèvre, 1890
 Cleorina fulvitarsis Lefèvre, 1887
 Cleorina gestroi Jacoby, 1896
 Cleorina gorbunovi Medvedev, 2008
 Cleorina grandis Eroshkina, 1988
 Cleorina hainana Gressitt & Kimoto, 1961
 Cleorina hirticollis Bryant, 1950
 Cleorina imperialis (Baly, 1867)
 Cleorina indica Jacoby, 1908
 Cleorina instriata Pic, 1937
 Cleorina jacobyi Duvivier, 1892
 Cleorina janthina Lefèvre, 1885
 Cleorina laeta Medvedev, 1995
 Cleorina longicornica Tan, 1992
 Cleorina longicornis Jacoby, 1908
 Cleorina luzonica Medvedev, 1995
 Cleorina major Kimoto & Gressitt, 1982
 Cleorina malayana Jacoby, 1896
 Cleorina manipurensis Jacoby, 1908
 Cleorina metallica Lefèvre, 1885
 Cleorina metallica Shukla, 1960 (homonym?)
 Cleorina mimica Medvedev & Eroshkina, 1983
 Cleorina mjoebergi (Weise, 1923)
 Cleorina modesta Jacoby, 1908
 Cleorina modiglianii Jacoby, 1896
 Cleorina morosa Lefèvre, 1885
 Cleorina nepalensis (Chûjô, 1966)
 Cleorina nigricornis Medvedev, 2009
 Cleorina nigrita Jacoby, 1895
 Cleorina nigroviridis Jacoby, 1908
 Cleorina nitidia Tan, 1981
 Cleorina nitidicollis Tan & Wang, 1981
 Cleorina nobilis Lefèvre, 1885
 Cleorina oblonga Jacoby, 1908
 Cleorina ornata Jacoby, 1896
 Cleorina papuana Bryant, 1950
 Cleorina philippinensis Jacoby, 1898
 Cleorina pulchella Lefèvre, 1885
 Cleorina pulchra Medvedev, 2009
 Cleorina puncticollis Jacoby, 1894
 Cleorina punctipleuris Medvedev, 2008
 Cleorina punctisterna Medvedev & Eroshkina, 1983
 Cleorina purpurea Lea, 1915
 Cleorina purpureipennis (Baly, 1867)
 Cleorina riedeli Medvedev, 2009
 Cleorina robusta Takizawa & Basu, 1987
 Cleorina schawalleri Medvedev, 2009
 Cleorina sculpturata (Motschulsky, 1860)
 Cleorina semipurpurea Jacoby, 1905
 Cleorina splendida Bryant, 1950
 Cleorina splendida Tan, 1992 (homonym)
 Cleorina strigicollis Medvedev & Eroshkina, 1983
 Cleorina strigosipleuris Medvedev, 2015
 Cleorina subnodosa Gressitt & Kimoto, 1961
 Cleorina substriata Medvedev, 2016
 Cleorina sulawensis Medvedev, 2008
 Cleorina sumatrana Jacoby, 1899
 Cleorina sumatrensis Lefèvre, 1885
 Cleorina suturata Jacoby, 1899
 Cleorina takizawai Medvedev & Sprecher-Uebersax, 1999
 Cleorina tibialis Lefèvre, 1885
 Cleorina verrucosa Medvedev, 2008
 Cleorina vietnamica Medvedev & Eroshkina, 1983
 Cleorina viridis (Baly, 1867)
 Cleorina viridissima Jacoby, 1905
 Cleorina xizangensis Tan & Wang, 1981

Synonyms:
 Cleorina bella (Jacoby, 1892): synonym of Cleorina janthina Lefèvre, 1885
 Cleorina bhamoensis (Jacoby, 1892): synonym of Cleorina sculpturata (Motschulsky, 1860)
 Cleorina capitata (Jacoby, 1892): synonym of Cleorina sculpturata (Motschulsky, 1860)
 Cleorina lefevrei Jacoby, 1890: synonym of Cleorina janthina Lefèvre, 1885
 Cleorina purpureipennis var. purpureicollis Pic, 1937: synonym of Cleorina janthina Lefèvre, 1885
 Cleorina purpureipennis var. violaceipennis Pic, 1937: synonym of Cleorina janthina Lefèvre, 1885

Renamed species:
 Cleorina costata Medvedev & Eroshkina, 1983: renamed to Cleorina costatella Medvedev, 2009
 Cleorina nepalensis Takizawa, 1985 (preoccupied by Cleorina nepalensis (Chûjô, 1966)): renamed to Cleorina takizawai Medvedev & Sprecher-Uebersax, 1999

References

External links
 Genus Cleorina Lefèvre, 1885 at Australian Faunal Directory

Eumolpinae
Chrysomelidae genera
Beetles of Australia
Beetles of Asia
Insects of New Guinea
Taxa named by Édouard Lefèvre